The year 1987 in archaeology involved some significant events.

Explorations

Excavations
 Gaziantep Museum excavations at Zeugma.

Finds
 June 20 - Arkaim in Southern Ural.
 Hoards from Milton Keynes and surrounding area of Buckinghamshire, England: coins from Little Brickhill and Walton.
 Skeleton of a woman dating from over 4,250 years ago found in Achavanich, a megalithic structure in Caithness, Scotland.
 Dufuna canoe, the oldest known boat outside Europe, found in Nigeria.

Publications

Events
December 8 - Chaco Culture National Historical Park is designated a UNESCO World Heritage Site.

Births

Deaths
 August 12 - Crystal Bennett, British archaeologist of Jordan (b. 1918)

References

Archaeology
Archaeology, 1987 In
Archaeology by year
Archaeology, 1987 In